Mima may refer to:

Places
In Japan
 Mima, Tokushima, city in western Tokushima prefecture
 Mima District, Tokushima in Tokushima Prefecture
 Mima, Ehime, town in the Kitauwa District, Ehime

In the United States
 Mima, Kentucky, unincorporated community
 Mima, Washington, unincorporated community

Elsewhere
 Mima (Tanzanian ward), ward in Tanzania

Name
 Mima Ito, (伊藤 美誠) (born 2000), Japanese table tennis player
 Mima Jaušovec (born 1956), Slovenian tennis player
 , Japanese wrestler
 Mima Soust, pseudonym of Uruguayan teacher and poet Alcira Soust Scaffo (1924–1997)
 , Japanese fashion model
 , Japanese professional baseball pitcher
 , Japanese model 
 , Japanese plasma physicist

Other uses
 Mima, a deified, semi-mystical machine in Harry Martinson's poem Aniara
 Mima (film), a 1991 French film featuring Nino Manfredi
 mima, the Middlesbrough Institute of Modern Art
 Mima mounds, a geological or ecological formation on the Mima Prairie in Thurston County, Washington
 Mima, a character from the dōjin game series Touhou Project
 Mima Kirigoe, a character in the 1997 anime film Perfect Blue
 MiMa, migration-manager, a tool for diagnosing binary incompatibilities for libraries generated with the Scala programming language

See also
 MIMA (disambiguation)
 Mimas (disambiguation)

Japanese feminine given names
Japanese-language surnames